Sowashee Creek is a stream in the U.S. state of Mississippi.

Sowashee is a name derived from the Choctaw language meaning "raccoons are there". Variant names are "Siwashee Creek", "Sowwasha Creek", and "Sowwashy Creek".

References

Rivers of Mississippi
Rivers of Lauderdale County, Mississippi
Mississippi placenames of Native American origin